Old Judy Church, also known as Old Log Church, is a historic Methodist Episcopal church building located near Petersburg, Pendleton County, West Virginia. It was built between 1836 and 1838, and is a rectangular hewn-log building measuring 24 feet wide and 28 feet deep.  It was abandoned in 1910, and rededicated in 1936 by the Methodist church. It is used as a community center for social gatherings.

It was listed on the National Register of Historic Places in 1976.

Gallery

References

Churches on the National Register of Historic Places in West Virginia
Methodist churches in West Virginia
Churches completed in 1838
19th-century Methodist church buildings in the United States
Buildings and structures in Pendleton County, West Virginia
National Register of Historic Places in Pendleton County, West Virginia